Charring cross is a junction in National Highway 67 (India) intersecting the commercial road and the Ooty-Coonoor road in Ooty, Tamil Nadu. It is considered to be one of the most important and beautiful places in Ooty. The important landmark in charring cross is the Gandhi Statue.

See also
 Government Rose Garden, Ooty
 Government Botanical Gardens, Udagamandalam
 Ooty Lake
 Ooty Golf Course
 Stone House, Ooty
 Ooty Radio Telescope
 Mariamman temple, Ooty
 St. Stephen's Church, Ooty
 Kamaraj Sagar Dam

References

External links
 Ooty / Udhagai / Udhagamandalam / Oootacamund Official history and tourism page on www.nilgiris.tn.gov.in. (This site is maintained by the District Administration of the Nilgiris)

Road junctions in India
Transport in Ooty
Roads in Tamil Nadu